Dancing the Sirtaki is a 1966 Greek musical film directed by George Skalenakis.

Cast 
 Aliki Vougiouklaki - Marina
 Dimitris Papamichael - Grigoris
 Vasilis Avlonitis - Vangelis
 Dionysis Papagiannopoulos - Lefteris
 Rika Dialina - Rita 
 Aris Maliagros - 
 Chronis Exarhakos - Kanelos (waiter)

References

External links 

1966 musical films
1966 films
Greek musical films
Greek black-and-white films
1960s Greek-language films